VW Hydri is a dwarf nova of the SU Ursae Majoris type in the deep southern constellation Hydrus; a star system that consists of a white dwarf and another generally cool star. It is one of the brightest dwarf novae systems in the sky. These systems are characterised by frequent eruptions and less frequent supereruptions. The former are smooth, while the latter exhibit short "superhumps" of heightened activity. The white dwarf sucks matter from the other star onto an accretion disc and periodically erupts, reaching apparent magnitude 8.4 in superoutbursts, 9.0 in normal outbursts and remaining at magnitude 14.4 when quiet. Normal outbursts occur every 27.3 days and last for 1.4 days, while superoutbursts happen 179 days and last for 12.6 days.

References

Hydrus (constellation)
Dwarf novae
Hydri, VW